{{DISPLAYTITLE:Tau2 Lupi}}

Tau2 Lupi, Latinized from τ2 Lup, is a binary star system in the constellation Lupus. It is visible to the naked eye with a combined apparent visual magnitude of 4.34. Based upon an annual parallax shift of 10.22 mas as seen from Earth, it is located around 319 light years from the Sun. The two components  orbit each other with a period of 26.2 years and a high eccentricity of 0.94. The brighter component is a magnitude 4.93 subgiant star with a stellar classification of F4 IV. Its companion is an A-type star with visual magnitude 5.55 and class A7:.

References

F-type subgiants
Lupus (constellation)
Lupi, Tau2
126354
070576
5396
Binary stars
Durchmusterung objects